Thunder Mountain may refer to:

Places

United States
Thunder Mountain (Amador County, California)
Thunder Mountain (Tulare County, California)
Thunder Mountain (Idaho)
Thunder Mountain (Washington)
Thunder Mountain, New Mexico, unincorporated community

Other countries
Thunder Mountain (Dall Island), Canada
Donnersberg, mountain peak in Germany
Mont-Tonnerre, an administrative region (département) within the First French Republic, now the Donnersbergkreis in Germany

Film and literature
Thunder Mountain (1925 film)
Thunder Mountain (1935 film)
Thunder Mountain (1947 film)

Other uses
Thunder Mountain High School, a public high school in Juneau, Alaska, US
Thunder Mountain Monument, in Imlay, Nevada, US
Thunder Mountain Motor Speedway, a racing facility in Texas, US
Thunder Mountain Ski Area, Massachusetts (later called Berkshire East Ski Resort)
Big Thunder Mountain Railroad, a rollercoaster in several Disney theme parks

See also 
"Thunder on the Mountain", a song on Bob Dylan's album Modern Times